The 1983 Canadian Professional Championship was a professional non-ranking snooker tournament, which took place between 23 August and 4 September 1983 at the Canadian National Exhibition Stadium in Toronto, Canada.

Kirk Stevens won his first professional title, beating Frank Jonik 9–6 in the final.

Main draw

References

Canadian Professional Championship
Canadian Professional Championship
Canadian Professional Championship
Canadian Professional Championship